The Super-G competitions of the 2011 IPC Alpine Skiing World Championships was held at Kandahar Banchetta Giovanni N., in Sestriere, Italy on January 18.

Women

Visually Impaired
In the Super-G visually impaired, the athlete with a visual impairment has a sighted guide. The two skiers are considered a team, and dual medals are awarded.

Standing

Sitting

Men

Visually Impaired
In the Super-G visually impaired, the athlete with a visual impairment has a sighted guide. The two skiers are considered a team, and dual medals are awarded.

Standing

Sitting

References

External links
2011 IPC Alpine Skiing World Championships - Super-G at ParalympicSportTV's Official YouTube channel

Super-G